Neurothemis tullia, the pied paddy skimmer, is a species of dragonfly found in south and south-east Asia. It appears in Bangladesh, China, Hong Kong, India, Malaysia (Peninsular Malaysia), Myanmar, Nepal, Sri Lanka, Taiwan, Thailand, Cambodia and Viet Nam.

Description and habitat
It is a black dragonfly with a pale yellow mid-dorsal carina of thorax. Wings are hyaline for apical half and opaque steely blue-black for basal half which is bordered by a milky white patch towards the tip. Females differ remarkably from the males both in body-colouring and markings and in marking of the wings. Its body is greenish yellow with a bright yellow mid-dorsal carina of thorax. Base of wings are amber yellow followed by a blackish brown patch. Apices of all wings are broadly opaque blackish brown and the remaining halves are pale yellow.

It breeds in marshes, well vegetated ponds, lakes and rice fields. It perches very close to ground and its flight is very weak.

See also 
 List of odonates of Sri Lanka
 List of odonates of India
 List of odonata of Kerala

References

External links
Pied Parasol (Neurothemis tullia tullia) - Kalahe, Galle, Sri Lanka
Md Rawi, Che Salmah (1996) Some Aspects of the Biology and Ecology of Neurothemis Tullia (Drury) (Odonata:Libellulidae) in the Laboratory and Rainfed Rice Field in Peninsular Malaysia. PhD thesis, Universiti Putra Malaysia.

Libellulidae
Insects described in 1773
Taxa named by Dru Drury